Tamara Dawnell Keith (born September 25, 1979) is NPR White House correspondent and co-host, with Scott Detrow, of the NPR Politics Podcast, joining as a business reporter in 2009. She covered the earthquake in Haiti and hosted B-side Radio, a 72-episode public radio podcast, from 2001 until 2010. She regularly appeared on the PBS NewsHour weekly segment "Politics Monday", until it was abruptly cancelled.  Keith was on the board of the White House Correspondents' Association, of which she is also the president.

Keith, in 2007, received first-place in the category "Outstanding Story, Radio" for "Overcrowded Prisons' Wastewater Poses Environmental Hazard (Mule Creek Prison)" on The California Report from the Society of Environmental Journalists in the sixth annual contest.

Life
Keith's family moved to Hanford, California, when she was eight years old. She started in radio as a "teen essayist" for NPR’s Weekend Edition Sunday. She graduated from high school early, received a bachelor's degree in philosophy from the University of California, Berkeley in three years, and enrolled at the Berkeley Graduate School of Journalism at age 19. Keith has a graduate degree in journalism from the University of California, Berkeley. She has worked for KQED, WOSU-FM, and KPCC.

Keith's husband, Ira Gordon, is a cancer researcher and veterinarian. Keith was raised Methodist  and is a convert to Judaism, the religion of her husband.

References

External links 
 Tamara Keith's Website
 B-side Radio
 Tamara Keith's Photo

1979 births
Living people
American radio reporters and correspondents
Jewish American journalists
University of California, Berkeley alumni
UC Berkeley Graduate School of Journalism alumni
PBS people
American women radio journalists
21st-century American Jews
21st-century American women